USS L-4 (SS-43) was an L-class submarine of the United States Navy.

Description
The L-class boats designed by Electric Boat (L-1 to L-4 and L-9 to L-11) were built to slightly different specifications from the other L boats, which were designed by Lake Torpedo Boat, and are sometimes considered a separate class. They displaced  on the surface and  submerged. The L-class submarines had a crew of 28 officers and enlisted men.

For surface running, the Electric Boat submarines were powered by two  diesel engines, each driving one propeller shaft. When submerged each propeller was driven by a  electric motor. They could reach  on the surface and  underwater.

The boats were armed with four 18-inch (450 mm)  torpedo tubes in the bow. They carried four reloads, for a total of eight torpedoes. The Electric Boat submarines were initially not fitted with a deck gun; a single 3"/50 caliber gun on a disappearing mount was added during the war.

Construction and career
L-4s keel was laid down on 23 March 1914 by Fore River Shipbuilding Company in Quincy, Massachusetts. She was launched on 3 April 1915 sponsored by Mrs. Stephen A. Gardner, and commissioned on 4 May 1916 with Lieutenant (junior grade) Lewis Hancock, Jr., in command.

Service history
Assigned to the Atlantic Submarine Flotilla, L-4 operated along the Atlantic coast, assisting in the development of new techniques in undersea warfare until April 1917.

Following the declaration of war on the Central Powers, the United States Navy dispatched submarines to European waters to protect the Allied shipping lanes. After a Philadelphia, Pennsylvania, overhaul, L-4 departed Newport, Rhode Island, on 4 December and steamed for the Azores. She departed Ponta Delgada on 19 January 1918, arriving for patrol operations at Berehaven, Ireland, on 27 January. While on patrol during April, L-4 twice encountered enemy U-boats in British waters and chased them from the paths of friendly convoys.

Based at Berehaven for the rest of the war, U.S. submarines protected Allied shipping from U-boat attacks. Following the Armistice with Germany, L-4 departed the Isle of Portland, England, on 3 January 1919 for the United States, arriving Philadelphia on 1 February.

For the next two years, the submarine operated along the East Coast performing experiments developing the tactics of undersea warfare. L-4 decommissioned at Philadelphia on 14 April 1922 and was sold to Pottstown Steel Company in Douglassville, Pennsylvania, on 31 July 1922 for scrapping.

Notes

References

External links
 

United States L-class submarines
World War I submarines of the United States
Ships built in Quincy, Massachusetts
1915 ships